Joana Guadalupe Jiménez Hernández (born December 15, 1985) is a Mexican luchadora, or female professional wrestler, better known as Dark  Silueta (Spanish for Dark "Silhouette"). She is working for the Mexican professional wrestling promotion Consejo Mundial de Lucha Libre (CMLL) and Japanese Reina Joshi Puroresu, portraying a tecnico ("Good guy") wrestling character. She originally worked as an enmascarada, or masked wrestler but was forced to unmask after losing a match to Zeuxis.

Personal life
Jiménez was born and still resides in Guadalajara, Jalisco, Mexico. She is married and the mother of two children, her first son was born in April 2010 and a son born in 2018.

Professional wrestling career
She began her training for a professional wrestling career at the age of only 13, training in the wrestling school of Francisco Gaitan. She made her professional wrestling debut in 2006 and received additional training from Consejo Mundial de Lucha Libre (CMLL) trainers Máscara Mágica II, Gran Cochisse and El Satánico She began wrestling as an enmascarada, or masked wrestler, using the ring name Silueta (Spanish for "Silhouette") and joined CMLL in 2008. CMLL decided to book Silueta in a storyline with ruda newcomer Zeuxis that developed in mis-2010. The storyline started out with the two being on opposite sides of a number of Best two out of three falls six-woman tag team matches where Zeuxis focused on trying to unmask her opponent, going so far as to rip Silueta's mask apart, causing Siluta to respond in kind. The storyline led to a Luchas de Apuestas, or "Bet match" between the two where the loser of the match would be forced to unmask and state their birth name after the loss as per Lucha Libre traditions. Zeuxis was successful, winning two of the three falls to force Silueta to unmask and reveal that her birthname was Joana Guadalupe Jiménez Hernández. Through her work in CMLL Silueta was invited to wrestle in Japan on several occasions, primarily for Universal Woman's Pro Wrestling Reina (Reina for short). On October 11, 2011, Silueta won an eight-woman torneo cibernetico elimination match to earn a match for the CMLL-Reina International Junior Championship. The match also included Dalys la Caribeña, Goya Kong, Kiara, Lady Apache, La Seductora, Princesa Blanca and Princesa Sujei. The following week, during CMLL's show in Arena Mexico Silueta defeated Ray to become the second ever CMLL-Reina International Junior Champion. She held the title until June 4, 2013, when she lost it to Zeuxis. She regained the title from Zeuxis on August 3, 2014. After a reign of only five days, Silueta lost the title to Maki Narumiya back in Japan. On August 30, Silueta won the title for the third time by defeating Narumiya in a rematch. On June 13, 2015, Silueta announced at a Reina event that she had signed with the promotion, making Reina her second home promotion alongside CMLL. On October 9, Silueta and Syuri defeated Makoto and Rina Yamashita to win the Reina World Tag Team Championship. They relinquished the title on March 16, 2016, due to Syuri's resignation from Reina. On January 29, 2017, Silueta lost the CMLL-Reina International Junior Championship to Keira.

Championships and accomplishments
Consejo Mundial de Lucha Libre
 Mexican National Women's Championship (1 time, current)
Women's Grand Prix (2021)
Universal Woman's Pro Wrestling Reina
CMLL-Reina International Junior Championship (3 times)
Reina World Tag Team Championship (1 time) – with Syuri
Pro Wrestling Illustrated
Ranked No. 38 of the top 150 female wrestlers in the PWI Female 150 in 2022

Luchas de Apuestas record

References

1985 births
Mexican female professional wrestlers
Living people
Professional wrestlers from Jalisco
People from Guadalajara, Jalisco
Mexican National Women's Champions
Reina World Tag Team Champions
21st-century professional wrestlers
CMLL-Reina International Junior Champions